Astrothelium pseudomegalophthalmum is a species of corticolous (bark-dwelling), crustose lichen in the family Trypetheliaceae. Found in Colombia, it was formally described as a new species in 2016 by Dutch lichenologist André Aptroot. The lichen has a smooth and somewhat shiny, pale olive-green thallus with a cortex and a thin black prothallus line. No lichen products were detected in collected samples using thin-layer chromatography. Its ascospores have seven septa and measure 152–166 by 32–37 μm. Its namesake species, A. megalophthalmum, also has large spores with seven septa.

References

pseudomegalophthalmum
Lichen species
Lichens described in 2016
Lichens of Colombia
Taxa named by André Aptroot